"Scorpio" is a song by American rapper Moneybagg Yo from the deluxe edition of his fourth studio album A Gangsta's Pain (2021). It was sent to rhythmic contemporary radio on November 16, 2021, as the fourth single from the album. The song features additional vocals from American singer Ja'niyah, and contains a sample of "How's It Goin' Down" by DMX featuring Faith Evans. In the song, Moneybagg Yo raps about winning over the love of a Scorpio.

Music video
A music video for the song was released on November 24, 2021. Ja'niyah is featured in the video, which sees Moneybagg Yo flirting with her and rapping on a rooftop in front of a skyline.

Charts

Weekly charts

Year-end charts

References

2021 singles
2021 songs
Moneybagg Yo songs
Interscope Records singles
Roc Nation singles